Jerman Vrh (in older sources also Jermanji Vrh) is a small settlement south of Bučka in the Municipality of Škocjan in southeastern Slovenia. Within the municipality, it belongs to the Local Community of Bučka. The area is part of the historical region of Lower Carniola. The municipality is now included in the Southeast Slovenia Statistical Region.

References

External links
Jerman Vrh at Geopedia

Populated places in the Municipality of Škocjan